Jeong Myeong-hui is a Korean name. Relevant people of this name are:

 Chung Myung-hee (born January 1964), South Korean badminton player
 Jeong Myung-hee (born May 1964), South Korean basketball player
 Jeong Myeong-hui (born 1966), South Korean politician